Shir Muhammad Khán or Sher Muhammad was a Khan of Moghulistan in 1421–1425.

Shir Muhammad Khán شیرمحمّدخان was the son of Muhammad Khan. Muhammad Khan had several brothers, one of whom was Shir Ali Oghlán. Shir Ali Oghlán died at the age of eighteen, and thus never attained the rank of Khán. He left one son, Uwais Khan, between whom and Shir Muhammad Khán arose great disputes. Shir Muhammad Khán, who was also a contemporary of Shah Rukh, enjoyed a longer reign than Muhammad Khán.
 
He was preceded by the first reign of Uwais Khan. He was followed by the second reign of Uwais Khan.

Chagatai Khanate

References 

Chagatai khans